Gordon Hickman Garland (May 16, 1898 – May 20, 1986) was a conservative Democratic California state legislator and the 48th Speaker of the California State Assembly. Garland also served as Director of the Department of Motor Vehicles in the 1940s and was also Commissioner of the California Highway Patrol. After leaving state government, he became a lobbyist for the Golden Gate Bridge District, the California Water Association, and the California Chiropractic Association and was widely regarded as an expert on water issues in California. Garland was one of ten legislators that wrote the legislation to create the Central Valley Project.

During his Speakership between 1940 and 1942, Garland was often at odds with Governor Culbert L. Olson, a fellow Democrat. Governor Olson's staff was implicated in an electronic eavesdropping scheme in 1940, when bugging devices were discovered in Garland's hotel room in Sacramento.

References

External links
 California Assembly web page
Join California - Gordon H. Garland

1898 births
1986 deaths
Speakers of the California State Assembly
Democratic Party members of the California State Assembly
20th-century American politicians